Kroppenstedtia guangzhouensis  is a Gram-positive, spore-forming, filamentous and aerobic bacterium from the genus of Kroppenstedtia which has been isolated from soil from China.

References

External links
Type strain of Kroppenstedtia guangzhouensis at BacDive -  the Bacterial Diversity Metadatabase

Bacillales
Bacteria described in 2013